The 2018–19 Saint Joseph's Hawks basketball team represented Saint Joseph's University during the 2018–19 NCAA Division I men's basketball season. The Hawks were led by 24th-year head coach Phil Martelli, and played their home games at Hagan Arena in Philadelphia, Pennsylvania as members of the Atlantic 10 Conference. They finished the season 14–19 overall, 6–12 in A-10 play to finish in a tie for tenth place. As the No. 10 seed in the A-10 tournament, they advanced to the quarterfinals, where they lost to Davidson.

On March 19, 2019, Phil Martelli was fired after 24 seasons as the head coach. He ended his tenure at Saint Joseph's with a 444–328 record. Shortly thereafter, the school hired Philadelphia 76ers assistant coach Billy Lange as head coach.

Previous season
The Hawks finished the 2017–18 season 16–16, 10–8 in A-10 play to finish in fourth place. They defeated George Mason in the quarterfinals of the A-10 tournament before losing to Rhode Island in the semifinals.

Offseason

Departures

Incoming transfers

2018 recruiting class

Roster

Schedule and results

|-
!colspan=9 style=| Regular season

|-
!colspan=9 style=| Atlantic 10 tournament

Source

References

Saint Joseph's Hawks men's basketball seasons
Saint Joseph's
Saint Joseph's
Saint Joseph's